Bill Kelly (born June 28, 1947) is a former American football player and coach.  Kelly played football for the University of North Carolina at Chapel Hill from 1965 to 1969 as a wide receiver, running back, and kick returner.

From 1971 to 1974, he served as an assistant coach for the team at the University of Richmond, where he received his Juris Doctor.

Kelly moved on to coach first as an assistant from 1979 to 1980, then as head at Snow College in Ephraim, Utah for the 1981 and 1982 seasons where he took the team to two bowls, one being Valley of the Sun.  During Kelly's time there, the team ranked in the top 10 junior college teams in America.

The 1983 to 1984 seasons saw Kelly at Eastern New Mexico University in Portales, New Mexico.  His overall coaching record at Eastern NMU was 13 wins, 7 losses, and 1 ties.  This ranks him seventh at Eastern NMU in terms of total wins and third at Eastern NMU in terms of winning percentage.

West Texas State University, now West Texas A&M University, in Canyon, Texas had Kelly as their head coach from 1985 to 1987.  In 1986, the team moved to the NCAA's Division II and won the Lone Star Conference championship.  Kelly could be heard and seen weekly on Sunday evenings on The Bill Kelly Show, both on television and radio.  During the half hour program, Kelly and his host discussed the game from the previous week, the upcoming game and strategy, and recruitment.

Kelly was awarded Coach of the Year in 1985 at the Missouri Valley Conference, and again in 1986 at the Lone Star Conference.

Kelly now practices as a family and criminal defense attorney in Canyon, Texas.

Head coaching record

College

References

1947 births
Living people
Eastern New Mexico Greyhounds football coaches
North Carolina Tar Heels football players
Richmond Spiders football coaches
Snow Badgers football coaches
West Texas A&M Buffaloes football coaches
Texas lawyers
People from Goldsboro, North Carolina
People from Canyon, Texas